Sylvia Barkan Rimm (born 1935) is an American psychologist specializing in parenting, child development and learning.  She has written books on raising gifted children, success for girls, and communication skills.

Rimm has a PhD. from the University of Wisconsin–Madison. She has been a clinical professor of psychiatry and pediatrics at Case Western Reserve University School of Medicine. She received her psychology license from the Ohio State Board of Psychology on March 12, 1993.

Books
Exploring Feelings: Discussion Book for Gifted Kids Have Feelings Too
Why Bright Kids Get Poor Grades: And What You Can Do About It
How to Parent So Children Will Learn
Education of the Gifted and Talented
Keys to Parenting the Gifted Child
Underachievement Syndrome: Causes and Cures
See Jane Win
See Jane Win for Girls: A Smart Girl's Guide to Success
How Jane Won
Gifted Kids Have Feelings Too
Raising Preschoolers
Sylvia Rimm on Raising Kids
Rescuing the Emotional Lives of Overweight Children
Growing Up Too Fast

References

External links
 

American women psychologists
Educational psychologists
University of Wisconsin–Madison alumni
1935 births
Living people
21st-century American women
American educational psychologists